Gerald Raphael 'Tip' O'Neill; (October 24, 1898 – December 6, 1984) was a player in the National Football League. He played for the Dayton Triangles. He died in 1984.

References

1898 births
1984 deaths
Dayton Triangles players
Detroit Titans football players
St. Norbert College alumni
People from Sault Ste. Marie, Michigan
Players of American football from Michigan